G protein-coupled receptor 128 is a protein encoded by the ADGRG7 gene. GPR128 is a member of the adhesion GPCR family.
Adhesion GPCRs are characterized by an extended extracellular region often possessing N-terminal protein modules that is linked to a TM7 region via a domain known as the GPCR-Autoproteolysis INducing (GAIN) domain.

GPR128 is specifically expressed in human liver as well as in mouse bone marrow and intestinal tissues.

Function 
Ni et al. showed that Gpr128 deletion in mice causes reduced body weight and induced intestinal contraction frequency.

Clinical significance 
A 111-kb copy number gain with breakpoints within the TRK-fused gene (a target of translocations in lymphoma and thyroid tumors) and GPR128 has been identified in the genome of patients with atypical myeloproliferative neoplasms. Notably, the fused gene was also detected in few healthy individuals.

References

External links 
 Adhesion GPCR consortium

G protein-coupled receptors